Robert Fagles (September 11, 1933 – March 26, 2008) was an American professor, poet, and academic. He was best known for his many translations of ancient Greek and Roman classics, especially his acclaimed translations of the epic poems of Homer. He taught English and comparative literature for many years at Princeton University.

Life
Fagles was born in Philadelphia, Pennsylvania, the son of Charles Fagles, a lawyer, and Vera Voynow Fagles, an architect. He attended Amherst College, graduating in 1955 with a Bachelor of Arts degree. The following year, he received his master's degree from Yale University. On June 17, 1956, he married Marilyn (Lynne) Duchovnay, a teacher, and they adopted two children. In 1959, Fagles received his Ph.D in English from Yale and for the next year taught English there.

From 1960 to 1962, Fagles was an English instructor at Princeton University. In 1962 he was promoted to assistant professor, and in 1965 became an associate professor of English and comparative literature. Later that year he became director of the comparative literature program. In 1970, he became a full professor, and from 1975 was the department chair. He retired from teaching as the Arthur W. Marks '19 Professor of Comparative Literature in 2002, and remained a professor emeritus at Princeton.

Between 1961 and 1996, Fagles translated many ancient Greek works. His first translation was of the poetry of Bacchylides, publishing a complete set in 1961. In the 1970s, Fagles began translating much Greek drama, beginning with Aeschylus's The Oresteia. He went on to publish translations of Sophocles's three Theban plays (1982), Homer's Iliad (1990) and Odyssey (1996), and Virgil's Aeneid (2006). In these last four, Bernard Knox authored the introduction and notes. Fagles's translations generally emphasize contemporary English phrasing and idiom but are faithful to the original as much as possible.

In 1978, Fagles published I, Vincent: Poems from the Pictures of Van Gogh. He was the co-editor of Homer: A Collection of Critical Essays (1962) and Pope's Iliad and Odyssey (1967).

Fagles died at his home in Princeton, New Jersey, on March 26, 2008, from prostate cancer.

Awards
Fagles was nominated for the National Book Award in Translation and won the Harold Morton Landon Translation Award of the Academy of American Poets in 1991 for his translation of the Iliad. In 1996, he received an Academy Award in Literature from the American Academy of Arts and Letters for his translation of the Odyssey. In 1997 he received the PEN/Ralph Manheim Medal for lifetime achievement in translation.  Fagles later undertook a new English translation of the Aeneid, which was published in November 2006.

In addition to the American Academy of Arts and Letters, Fagles was also a member of the American Academy of Arts and Sciences and the American Philosophical Society.

He received a National Humanities Medal by the National Endowment for the Humanities.

On June 8, 2011, a resource center devoted to the study of the Classics was dedicated to Dr. Fagles at Princeton High School.  At the dedication, students and teachers paid tribute to Dr. Fagles.

Translations
 Bacchylides, Complete Poems (1961)
 Aeschylus, The Oresteia (1975)
 Sophocles, The Three Theban Plays (1982)
 Antigone
 Oedipus the King
 Oedipus at Colonus
 Homer, The Iliad (1990)
 Homer, The Odyssey (1996)
 Virgil, The Aeneid (2006)

See also
English translations of Homer by Robert Fagles

References

External links
 

1933 births
2008 deaths
American classical scholars
American translators
Amherst College alumni
Members of the American Academy of Arts and Letters
Deaths from prostate cancer
Princeton University faculty
Deaths from cancer in New Jersey
Latin–English translators
National Humanities Medal recipients
Greek–English translators
Homeric scholars
Translators of Ancient Greek texts
Translators of Homer
Translators of Virgil
20th-century translators
Members of the American Philosophical Society